Blaire (born June 6, 1994), known online as QTCinderella, is an American Twitch streamer and YouTuber. She is known as the creator and co-host of The Streamer Awards. , QTCinderella is signed to Misfits Gaming as a content creator.

Career

2018–2020 
QTCinderella started streaming on Twitch in 2018, though she had wanted to stream since 2015. From the beginning, her content has focused on gaming, baking, and creating collaborative content with other creators. Since as early as June 2019, she has frequently made collaborative content with her current partner and fellow streamer Ludwig Ahgren.

2021 
QTCinderella joined Team SoloMid on September 21, 2021.

On September 27, 2021, QTCinderella organized ShitCamp in Los Angeles, California. It was a summer event with several Twitch streamers, including Adeptthebest, Ludwig Ahgren, AustinShow, HasanAbi, JustaMinx, Myth, Sodapoppin, and xQc. Live-streamed activities from the five-day event included a scavenger hunt in Santa Monica, a cooking competition, a day at a gun range, a pajama party with drinking games, and a kickball tournament featuring the ShitCamp participants along with two visiting teams from 100 Thieves and OfflineTV.

In November, QTCinderella started a podcast titled Wine About It with fellow streamer Maya Higa. In the podcast, she and Maya dress up, drink wine, and discuss stories and events from their lives.

2022 
QTCinderella founded and co-hosted the inaugural Streamer Awards, which took place on March 12, 2022 at The Fonda Theatre in Los Angeles. The event was live streamed on her Twitch channel to an average audience of 276,004 viewers, with a peak viewership of 381,436. The event cost around $200k to produce, and 27 awards were given to various streamers based on a weighted combination of fan voting (70%) and a panelist vote (30%). Several prominent streamers attended as nominees and guests, including Amouranth, HasanAbi, Pokimane, and xQc.

Two months later on May 14, QTCinderella hosted Twitch Rivals: QTCinderella's Sweet Showdown ft. Kitchen League, a baking competition featuring fellow creators Rich Campbell, Cyr, HasanAbi, and Myth.

On June 2, talent management firm Loaded announced that they had signed QTCinderella.

On September 5, 2022, QTCinderella organized the second iteration of ShitCamp in Fresno, California.

On November 3, 2022, QTCinderella joined Misfits Gaming, which had just established a $20 million content creator fund.

2023 
On January 30, 2023, QTCinderella became aware of the unauthorized, pornographic use of her likeness on a deepfake website. The existence of the non-consensual sexual material was discovered after streamer and former collaborator Brandon Ewing, professionally known as Atrioc, inadvertently revealed the website in a browser tab while streaming. In addition to QTCinderella, the website infringed on the likeness of various other individuals, including streamers Maya Higa and Pokimane. As a result of efforts by QTCinderella and attorney Ryan Morrison, the website was promptly taken offline. QTCinderella's partner, Ludwig Ahgren, has stated that the experience has had a lingering impact on her mental well-being.

Personal life 
QTCinderella grew up in a Mormon household but is no longer a member of the faith. After graduating high school, she attended culinary school, where she learned skills that she frequently uses in her content.

QTCinderella currently lives in Los Angeles, California, with fellow streamer and boyfriend Ludwig Ahgren.

Discography

Albums
 A Very Mogul Christmas (2020)

Awards and nominations

References

External links 

1994 births
American YouTubers
Living people
People from Los Angeles
Twitch (service) streamers
Women video bloggers
YouTube vloggers